Tennessean refers to someone or something of, from, or related to the state of Tennessee, including:
 The Tennessean newspaper
 Tennessean (train)

See also
 List of people from Tennessee
 Tennessine, named after the state of Tennessee, a similar sounding name for the chemical element number 117